The European Rallycross Championship (former abbreviation ERC, now Euro RX or ERX) is a rallycross competition held in Europe, organised under the auspices of the FIA.

History
The predecessor championship began in 1973 as the Embassy/ERA European Rallycross Championship. In 1976 the FIA created regulations for rallycross, including Group 5 regulations for the cars, and awarded the first official European cup. For 1978 two classes became introduced, one class for Touring cars and one for Grand Touring cars, but the FIA European Cup was for the driver with the most scored points from both Divisions, Norwegian Martin Schanche. In 1979 Schanche claimed the first ever true FIA European Championship title.

In 1982 the FIA reorganized the classes into Division 1, for Group A but restricted to two-wheel drive, and Division 2 for the so-called Rallycross Specials, which allowed the use of four-wheel drive. The first European Champions under this new rules became Norwegian Egil Stenshagen and Austrian Franz Wurz (father of ex-Formula One driver Alexander Wurz).

After several major accidents, Group B cars were banned from the WRC at the end of 1986, but found their new home in the European Rallycross Championship in 1987. Division 1 continued to use only two-wheel drive touring cars, but the Division 2 received the exotic Group B machinery such as the Peugeot 205 Turbo 16 E2, Ford RS200 E2, Lancia Delta S4, Audi Sport Quattro S1 or MG Metro 6R4, which continued to be prepared past their highest point of evolution in rallying.

Beginning in the 1993 season, the Group B cars disappeared and the four-wheel drive "specials" came into the era. Division 1 was now open to four-wheel drive cars, but using Group N regulations. Division 2 was based in Group A, but allowing several extra modifications such as changing to a different engine produced by the same manufacturer, adding a turbocharger or four-wheel drive. This allowed the creation of machines based on the Citroën Xantia, Peugeot 306 or Ford Escort RS2000. A third division was added, for two-wheel drive cars up to 1.4 litres, called 1400 Cup, but the title was recognized by the FIA only in 1995.

In 1997, the divisions were swapped, with Division 1 now becoming the primary class, with Group A-based cars, and Group N moving to Division 2. In 1999, Division 1 was allowed cars based on WRC and Supertouring regulations, but with the same set of freedoms as the Group A (adding turbochargers and four-wheel drive where needed). Division 2 kept Group N, but with a maximum displacement of 2.0 litres and only two-wheel drive. In 2001 the 1400 Cup's status was upgraded to Division 2A.

For 2003, the class format was revised once more, assuming the form that is currently used. Division 1 and Division 2 remain essentially identical, with 4WD turbocharged Group A "specials" and 2WD normally aspirated 2.0 litre Group N cars, respectively, but a new Division A1 was created to replace the 1400 Cup, with regular Group A cars up to 1.6 litres.

In 2013 the European Rallycross Championship was promoted for the first time by IMG Motorsports. Rebranded as RallycrossRX (brand is not in official use any longer) the championship underwent changes to the racing format.

In 2014, the FIA approved plans for championship to become a fully sanctioned FIA World Championship. Together with the creation of the FIA World Rallycross Championship (World RX), the European Rallycross Championship (Euro RX) was restructured into a five round championship Supercar series with races in Great Britain, Norway, Belgium, Germany and Italy, while all nine rounds of the World RX to be held in Europe count for the European titles of the Super1600 and TouringCar drivers.

Champions

See also
FIA World Rallycross Championship

References

External links

 

 
European auto racing series
Rallycross racing series
Recurring sporting events established in 1976
1976 establishments in Europe